A Woman in Charge: The Life of Hillary Rodham Clinton is a biography of United States Senator and former First Lady of the United States, Hillary Clinton, that was written by Carl Bernstein and published on June 5, 2007, by Alfred A. Knopf.

Background
Bernstein spent eight years working on the book. He is said to have interviewed around  200 people in connection with his research. He did not receive cooperation from the Clintons for the project.

The existence of the work was first announced by publisher Knopf on April 23, 2007, with a scheduled publication date of June 19, 2007.

The book came out at the same time as another mainstream biography, Jeff Gerth and Don Van Natta Jr.'s Her Way: The Hopes and Ambitions of Hillary Rodham Clinton. The respective publishers both moved up the release dates of their books in the act of competition, with in particular the Gerth-Van Natta work getting moved up from August; in the end the Bernstein book came out first by three days.

Beyond scheduling, there was some trash talking between the publishers: the editor in chief of Little, Brown, which was putting out Her Way, made reference to how Knopf had published Bill Clinton's quite successful autobiography My Life and expressed doubt as to how "objective and critical Knopf can be about Hillary when it's also publishing Bill."
Knopf's  editor said in response, "The editorial integrity of this (publishing) house speaks for itself. It's ludicrous for Little, Brown to suggest that. They should be very careful if they're going down that road."
The Little, Brown editor said. "We [feel] confident we [can] go up against [Bernstein]", while the Knopf editor said that Little, Brown's "desire to link to our publication is understandable, especially since Bernstein will create a tidal wave of interest. They hope a rising tide raises all boats. But ... their book could drown in our wake."

Political impacts
The book was published while Clinton's 2008 presidential campaign was underway. According to reviewers at The Washington Post, the Clinton campaign was "nervous" about new revelations from this or the Gerth-Van Natta book. The Clintons had a less negative feeling about Bernstein's effort, given that they had a special antipathy towards Her Way due to Gerth's role in reporting the Whitewater scandal, the controversy of which had bedeviled them for much of the Bill Clinton administration. As for the Bernstein book's title, the Boston Globe wrote that "She's not in charge yet, of course, but perhaps the title is meant to suggest that she is a take-charge woman."

Once the books came out, while there were many items of interest, there were no blockbusters that would constitute political damage.  A Clinton spokesman said, "Is it possible to be quoted yawning?" and that, "these books are nothing more than cash for rehash." Media Matters for America had no major objections to it compared to Her Way, aside from criticizing Bernstein on some grounds, such as falsely claiming during interviews for the book that he had revealed that Clinton had failed the D. C. Bar Exam, when in fact she had revealed it herself four years prior.

The general consensus was that while the Gerth-Van Natta book was a little on the negative side towards its subject, the Bernstein effort was a little on the positive side, notwithstanding  that both were mainstream works. As The Washington Post wrote, "Unlike many harsh books about Clinton written by ideological enemies, the two new volumes come from long-established writers backed by major publishing houses and could be harder to dismiss."

Critical response
Many  critics reviewed this and the Gerth-Van Natta book in tandem. Reviews for A Woman in Charge were generally mixed-to-positive.

Reviewing the book for The New York Times, historian Robert Dallek asserted that the book presents "a [reasonably] balanced and convincing picture" of Clinton ... [but] also has its limitations. ... Bernstein  includes too much recounting of familiar details about the Clintons' past." He concluded that the Bernstein work was more neutral than the more negatively framed Gerth-Van Natta account.

Professor Linda Colley of the London Review of Books said that the book was "well-written" and "considered", especially in contrast to the Gerth-Van Natta rival. Several reviewers noted that A Woman in Charge had next to nothing about Clinton's Senate career. The Rocky Mountain News wrote that "Carl Bernstein's much-hyped unauthorized biography of Hillary Rodham Clinton, A Woman in Charge, is neither a bomb nor a bombshell ...  he disappoints [in] devoting about 20 pages to her years in the U.S. Senate and a scant three pages to her decision to run for president. It's as if he lost steam in his eight-year labor and then rushed to print as she became a presidential front-runner."

The New Yorker writer Elizabeth Kolbert saw Bernstein as trying to prove that Clinton is "really no worse than you think she is. ... Even as he chronicles one fabulous misstep after another, he describes the former First Lady as 'well-intentioned' and 'principled,' motivated by deep religious faith and a passionate sense of caring." Kolbert illustrated with a case in point, when in pointed contrast to Gerth-Van Natta, Bernstein writes that Whitewater was "overblown almost from the moment The New York Times first wrote about it."

Promotion and sales
Knopf had initially announced a first printing of 350,000 copies. As publication actually approached this was revised to a print run of 275,000.

Initial sales of the book were quite modest, with Nielsen BookScan reporting 25,000 copies sold in its first 13 days (about three times what the Gerth-Van Natta book was doing but far less than Clinton's 2003 autobiography Living History). It appeared on the New York Times Best Seller List for three weeks, debuting at #7 for the week of June 24, falling to #13 the next week, and spending its last week on the chart at #14 for July 8.

A CBS News end-of-year survey of publishing "hits and misses" included A Woman in Charge in the "miss" category and implied that its total sales were somewhere in the range of perhaps 55,000–65,000 copies. Likely its sales were impinged at least somewhat by the existence of the rival Gerth-Van Natta work, but in any case fell far short of the size of the initial printing. Despite all the talk up front, the book had not been the major best seller that the publisher had been expecting.

References

External links
 Author's website page for book 
 Excerpt  from the book 

2007 non-fiction books
Alfred A. Knopf books
Books about Hillary Clinton
Unauthorized biographies
American political books
Books by Carl Bernstein